Mount Danxia is a noted scenic mountainous area in Renhua County, in the northern part of Guangdong province. It is described on the local signage as a "world famous UNESCO geopark of China". It was inscribed as part of the China Danxia World Heritage Site in 2010 because of its unique geographical in  formations and spectacular scenery.

Description
The Danxia area is formed from a reddish sandstone which has been eroded over time into a series of outcrops surrounded by spectacular cliffs and many unusual rock formations known as Danxia landform.  There are a number of temples located on the mountains and many scenic walks can be undertaken.  There is also a river winding through the mountains on which boat trips can be taken.

Rock formations
Among other attractions that make the Danxia range interesting, the area has the following characteristic stone formations: 
Yang Yuan Stone, ( "male/father stone") bearing a remarkable resemblance to a phallus
Yin Yuan Stone or  hole, which somewhat resembles a vulva.
Sleeping Beauty, a rocky range resembling a sleeping maiden.

Geology 
Mount of Danxia is identified by multi-layered red sedimentary rocks of sandstone and conglomerate, and the area of was formed by the fluvial deposition through the basin 140-65 million years ago. The weather in Danxia area assist the oxidation reaction in rocks, and turned the color of them into red. Then these sediments were uplifted and condescend by water, and being accreted during the process. Finally, the area of Danxia was formed. With the favor of water washing by the river, the mount of Danxia is cut into many layers, and formed the mount of Danxia nowadays.

Climate 
Mount of Danxia locate at the southern side of the Nan Mountains, and it is in the subtropical southern margin, which is the humid subtropical climate.

Temperature 
The average temperature in autumn is higher than spring's.

Sunshine 
More sunshine for July to September, less for February to April.

Precipitation 
The precipitation from March to August is about the 75% of total precipitation in a year, and the most concentrated precipitation is from April to June, which is about 48% precipitation of a year.

Humidity 
The average absolute humidity of Danxia mount is 19.8mb, and the relative humidity is 81%.

Natural resources

Plants 
The flora of Danxia Mountain is mainly composed by the tropical and subtropical flora, but lacks the typical tropical genus, and the amount of the moss is relatively large. The landform of DanXia has significant effects on the growth of plants. Since the mount of DanXia has many deep valleys, grooves, the environment of Danxia is moisture, which in favor of the growth of moss. Also, The special landscape and the humid monsoon climate permit the growth of evergreen broadleaf forests, endemic plants, endangered and new species such as Danxia Viola, Danxia orchid, Danxia Firmiana and Danxia Chiritopsis.

Animals 
Various wild animals exist in the mount of Danxia, including 88 species of mammals, 288 species of birds, 86 species of reptiles, 37 species (or subspecies) of amphibians, 100 species or subspecies of fish, and 1023 species of insects. Also, there are 59 species of animals, in Danxia mountain, enlisted in the "Red List of China Species"; 73 species of animals enlisted in the IUCN Red List ;  66 species enlisted in CITES.

Ancient heritage 

On the margin of the southwest Danxia basin, a cracked skull was found, and the evidence shows that it is the skull of a Maba man, which is around 30,000 years old.

Features

See also
China Danxia
 List of World Heritage Sites in China
List of mountain ranges in the world named The Sleeping Lady
 Sacred Mountains of China

References

External links

 Guangdong: Yangyuan Stone. Retrieved 2007-3-31.
 Guangdong: Yinyuan Hole. Retrieved 2007-3-31.

Danxia
Global Geoparks Network members
Danxia landform
Tourist attractions in Guangdong
Shaoguan
Geoparks in China